Kevin Braunskill (born March 31, 1969) is an American former sprinter. A graduate of North Carolina State University, Braunskill is an 11x NCAA D1 All-American, World Junior champion, World Cup champion, Pan American Champion all at 200m. He was also a 10x USA National championships finalist in the event with a best time of 20.01 and highest world ranking of 6. He received a 1-year suspension after he tested positive for a PED at the New York Games on May 22, 1994. USA Track and Field exonerated Braunskill of any wrongdoing, but the suspension came from IAAF and effected his European competitions. He went on to compete for another 10 years in the sport. Braunskill is probably best known for what he did those next 10 years. He took advantage of a bad situation and vowed to do right by it. His belief was that "you won't be great until you do more without the spikes on your feet than you do with the spikes on your feet." Remarkably, Braunskill never lost his Home Depot or Champion Apparel sponsors. In fact, he used this platform to travel more than any other track and field athlete. He donated 100% of his appearance fees to whatever organization that had kids in the town and country he competed in. From giving teddy bears to the sick youth at a children's hospital in Tel Aviv, Israel to providing South Africa's poverty stricken housing developments with anti fire paint to paint their homes. Braunskill has definitely become an ambassador around the world and can definitely say he has done more to influence without his spikes than with his spikes. He is a Bronze Star decorated retired Army Officer.  Braunskill is married to Shantal Braunskill of Cape Town, South Africa and they have two children, Kevin jr and Chelsea.

References

1969 births
Living people
American male sprinters
Universiade medalists in athletics (track and field)
Athletes (track and field) at the 1991 Pan American Games
Universiade bronze medalists for the United States
Medalists at the 1989 Summer Universiade
Pan American Games track and field athletes for the United States